The San Carlo Borromeo-class ships of the line were a class of two 66-gun third rates built by the Venetian Arsenal from 1750 to 1793.

Design
Being built to hold 66 guns, by Venetian standards were considered Vascelli di Primo Rango, or first rate ship of the line. By contemporary Royal Navy standards, though, this number would make them third rate ships of the line.

The namesake ship of the class, the San Carlo Borromeo, originally was armed with 28 40-pounds guns on the lower gundeck, 26 20-pounds guns on the upper one and 12 14-pounds guns on the quarterdeck.

On the Vulcano, launched in 1793, of the 66 guns 26 were 40-pounds cannons, 28 were 30-pounds cannons, and 12 were 14-pounds cannons, located on the lower, upper, and quarterdecks, respectively.

The namesake ship, the San Carlo Borromeo, was haunted by a recurring problem: in stormy seas, it had a tendency to lose the rudder. This problem eventually led to its wreck. The only other ship made with the same plans was subsequently modified in 1788 while still in the dockyard, resulting in a great improvement in maneuverability and sailing speed.

This class was prone to the same drawbacks of its contemporary Leon Trionfante class, which affected most of the sailing ships of the Venetian Navy at the time.

History
Little is known of the commanders of either ships, as none took part in important events. It is known, however, that Vulcano  was captained by Zuanne Balielo from 30 April 1793 to the end of 1793.

Ships

References

Citations

Websites

See also
 Venetian navy

 
Ship of the line classes
Ships built by the Venetian Arsenal
18th century in the Republic of Venice
Charles Borromeo